Onyekachukwu Aloso (born 16 October 1986) is a Nigerian retired footballer who played as a defender.

References

1986 births
Living people
Nigerian footballers
Sportspeople from Lagos
Association football defenders
Persisam Putra Samarinda players
Persidafon Dafonsoro players
Liga 1 (Indonesia) players
Liga 2 (Indonesia) players
Nigerian expatriate footballers
Expatriate footballers in Indonesia
Nigerian expatriate sportspeople in Indonesia